Aliasker Bashirov (born June 27, 1979) is an amateur boxer from Ashgabat, Turkmenistan, who fought at the 2004 and 2008 Olympics at welterweight.

Bashirov qualified for the 2004 Summer Olympics in Athens by ending up in second place at the 1st AIBA Asian 2004 Olympic Qualifying Tournament in  Guangzhou, China. In the final, he lost to Kanat Islam of China. At the 2004 Summer Olympics, he beat Rolandas Jasevicius but lost his second match to the eventual winner, Bakhtiyar Artayev of Kazakhstan.

At the 2008 Summer Olympics, he lost his first bout to Jaoid Chiguer (6:17).

External links
 Yahoo data
 sports-reference

1979 births
Living people
Boxers at the 2006 Asian Games
Boxers at the 2010 Asian Games
Boxers at the 2004 Summer Olympics
Boxers at the 2008 Summer Olympics
Olympic boxers of Turkmenistan
Sportspeople from Ashgabat
Turkmenistan male boxers
Asian Games competitors for Turkmenistan
Welterweight boxers